The former National Guard Armory of Batesville, Arkansas, is located at 380 South Ninth Street.  Built in 1936, it is a large and imposing sandstone structure with Gothic Revival and Art Deco features.

It was designed by Peter Blaauw, a Dutch architect from Sulphur Rock, and built with funding from the Works Progress Administration.  After the National Guard vacated the facility in 1976, it was used for storage and sat vacant until about 1998, when it was adapted for use by the Old Independence Regional Museum.

The building was listed on the National Register of Historic Places in 1998.

See also
National Register of Historic Places listings in Independence County, Arkansas

References

External links
Old Independence Regional Museum

Military facilities on the National Register of Historic Places in Arkansas
Gothic Revival architecture in Arkansas
Art Deco architecture in Arkansas
Government buildings completed in 1936
Buildings and structures in Batesville, Arkansas
Museums in Independence County, Arkansas
National Register of Historic Places in Independence County, Arkansas
Works Progress Administration in Arkansas
Arkansas National Guard
1936 establishments in Arkansas
Sandstone buildings in the United States